Robert Silliman Hillyer (June 3, 1895 – December 24, 1961) was an American poet and professor of English literature. He won a Pulitzer Prize for poetry in 1934.

Early life 
Hillyer was born in East Orange, New Jersey to an old Connecticut family. He attended Kent School in Kent, Connecticut. After high school, he attended Harvard University, graduating cum laude in 1917. While there, he was the editor of the literary magazine The Harvard Advocate, and was affiliated with the group known as the Harvard Aesthetes.

When World War I began, he went to France and volunteered for the Norton-Harjes Ambulance Corps, along with Harvard classmate John Dos Passos. Once the United States entered the war, he joined the American forces. After serving as an ambulance driver, Hillyer later returned to France to work in the US Ordnance Department. After the Armistice, Hillyer worked as a military courier for the 1919 peace conference in Paris. For a while Hillyer and John Dos Passos shared a flat in Paris and even collaborated on an unpublished novel which they called "Great Novel" (or "G.N.", or "Seven Times round the Walls of Jericho"). Eventually the novel was abandoned in 1921 even though Dos Passos  said that Hillyer's contributions had "genuineness" and "more tone than mine."

Career

Academic 
Hillyer became a professor of English at Harvard University in 1919. In the late 1920s, he taught at Trinity College and was made a member of the Epsilon chapter of the literary fraternity St. Anthony Hall in 1927.

From 1937 to 1944, he was named to the Boylston Professorship of Rhetoric and Oratory at Harvard. From 1948 to 1951 Hillyer was a visiting professor at Kenyon College. He also taught at the University of Delaware from 1952 until his death. While at Delaware Hillyer did various regular poetry readings between 1953-1960 which were recorded and are now available for listening through the university's archives.

Over his academic life, Hillyer taught a number of writers (and poets)  who later became well-known such as Theodore Roethke, James Gould Cozzens,  Howard Nemerov,  James Agee, Norman Mailer, Robert Fitzgerald and  John Simon.

Poet 
In 1919, Hillyer described himself as “a conservative and religious poet in a radical and blasphemous age." In 1934, he received a Pulitzer Prize for Poetry for his book The Collected Verse of Robert Hillyer. His work is in meter and often rhyme and he tended to write about death, love and nature. He is known for his sonnets and for poems such as "Theme and Variations" (on his war experiences) and the light "Letter to Robert Frost."

He became president of the Conservative Poetry Society of America. In this capacity, he attacked modernist poets such as T. S. Eliot and Ezra Pound.

Awards and honors
 Pulitzer Prize for Poetry for "Collected Verse" in 1934.
 He was named to the Boylston Professorship of Rhetoric and Oratory at Harvard University in 1937.
 His papers are housed at Syracuse University.

Works

Poetry
 The Collected Poems (Alfred Knopf, 1961)
 The Relic & Other Poems (Knopf, 1957).
 The Suburb by the Sea: New Poems (Knopf, 1952)
 The Death of Captain Nemo: A Narrative Poem (A.A. Knopf, 1949)
 Poems for Music, 1917–1947. (1947)
 Pattern of a Day (1940)
 In a Time of Mistrust (1939)
 A Letter to Robert Frost and Others (1937).
 The Collected Verse of Robert Hillyer. (A. A. Knoft, 1933)
 The Gates of the Compass: A Poem in Four Parts Together with Twenty-Two Shorter Pieces (Viking Press, 1930)
 The Seventh Hill (Viking Press, 1928)
 The Halt in the Garden (Elkin Matthews,1925)
 The Coming Forth by Day: An Anthology of Poems from the Egyptian Book of the Dead (B.J. Brimmer Company, 1923)
 Hills Give Promise, a Volume of Lyrics, Together with Carmus: A Symphonic Poem (B.J. Brimmer Company, 1923)
 Alchemy: A Symphonic Poem (Kessinger Publishing, 1920)
 The Five Books of Youth (Brentano's, 1920)
 Sonnets and Other Lyrics (Harvard University Press, 1917)
 Eight Harvard Poets (1917), which included works by E. E. Cummings and John Dos Passos

Novels
 Riverhead (Alfred Knopf, 1932)
 My Heart for Hostage (Random House, 1942)  In 2022 this novel was digitized and made available for free download by Personville Press.

Criticism and scholarship
 In Pursuit of Poetry (McGraw-Hill, 1960)*
 First Principles of Verse. (The Writer, Inc., 1938).
 Some Roots of English Poetry (Wheaton College Press, 1933)

Editor and/or translator
 
 Kahlil Gibran. A Tear and a Smile. Introduction by Robert Hillyer. (A. A. Knopf, 1959).
 Eight More Harvard Poets. Edited by Samuel Foster Damon and Robert Hillyer. (Brentano, 1923)
 Complete Poetry and Selected Prose of John Donne and The Complete Poetry of William Blake, Introduction by Robert Hillyer, Random House: New York,  1941. pages xv-lv.

Personal 
In 1926, he married Dorothy Hancock Tilton. They had one son, but divorced in 1943.

He was 66 when he died in Wilmington, Delaware.

See also
List of ambulance drivers during World War I

References

External links 

 Robert Hillyer: Recordings of Poets Reading their Own Poems
 
  MSS 0696 - University of Delaware audio recordings of poetry readings. Audio of various poetry readings Hillyer gave between 1953-1960. 
 Digital Works by Robert Hillyer on Project Gutenberg

1895 births
1961 deaths
People from East Orange, New Jersey
Kent School alumni
Harvard University alumni
Harvard Advocate alumni
American Field Service personnel of World War I
20th-century American poets
Danish–English translators
20th-century translators
Harvard University faculty
Trinity College (Connecticut) faculty
St. Anthony Hall
Pulitzer Prize for Poetry winners
Kenyon College faculty
University of Delaware faculty
Writers from East Orange, New Jersey